William Hall Macy Jr. (born March 13, 1950) is an American actor. His film career has been built on appearances in small, independent films, though he has also appeared in mainstream films. Some of his best known starring roles include those in Fargo (1996), Air Force One (1997), Boogie Nights (1997), Magnolia (1999), Jurassic Park III (2001), Seabiscuit (2003), Thank You for Smoking (2005), and The Lincoln Lawyer (2011). Macy has won two Emmy Awards and four Screen Actors Guild Awards, while his performance in Fargo earned a nomination for the Academy Award for Best Supporting Actor. From 2011 to 2021, he played Frank Gallagher, a main character in Shameless, the Showtime adaptation of the British television series. Macy has been married to Felicity Huffman since 1997.

Early life
Macy was born in Miami, Florida, and grew up in Georgia and Maryland. His father, William Hall Macy Sr. (1922–2007), was awarded the Distinguished Flying Cross and an Air Medal for flying a B-17 Flying Fortress bomber in World War II; he later ran a construction company in Atlanta, Georgia, and worked for Dun & Bradstreet before taking over a Cumberland, Maryland-based insurance agency when Macy was nine years old. His mother, Lois (née Overstreet; 1920–2001), was a war widow who met Macy's father after her first husband died in 1943; Macy has described her as a "Southern belle".

Macy graduated from Allegany High School in Cumberland, Maryland, in 1968, and went on to Bethany College in West Virginia, where he studied veterinary medicine. A "wretched student" by his own admission, he transferred to Goddard College in rural Vermont, where he studied under playwright David Mamet, and graduated in 1972. He studied theater at HB Studio in New York City.

Career
After graduating from Goddard, Macy originated roles in a number of plays by collaborator David Mamet, such as American Buffalo and The Water Engine. While in Chicago in his twenties, he did a TV commercial. He was required to join AFTRA in order to do the commercial, and received his SAG card within a year, which for an elated Macy represented an important moment in his career.

Macy spent time in Los Angeles before moving to New York City in 1980, where he had roles in over fifty Off Broadway and Broadway plays. One of his earliest on-screen roles was as a theater critic congratulating Christopher Reeve in 1980's Somewhere In Time, under the name W.H. Macy (so as not to be confused with the actor Bill Macy). Another memorable early performance was as a turtle named Socrates in the direct-to-video film The Boy Who Loved Trolls (1984). He also had a minor role as a hospital orderly on the sitcom Kate & Allie in the fourth-season episode "General Hospital", and played an assistant district attorney in "Everybody's Favorite Bagman", the first produced episode of Law & Order; in both appearances, he was billed as W. H. Macy. He has appeared in numerous films that Mamet wrote and/or directed, such as House of Games, Things Change, Homicide, Oleanna (reprising the role he originated in the play of the same name), Wag the Dog, State and Main and Spartan.

Macy's leading role in Fargo helped boost his career and recognizability, though at the expense of nearly confining him to a narrow typecast of a worried man down on his luck. Other Macy roles of the 1990s and 2000s included Benny & Joon, Above Suspicion, Mr. Holland's Opus, Ghosts of Mississippi, Air Force One, Boogie Nights, A Civil Action, Pleasantville, Gus Van Sant's remake of Psycho, Happy, Texas, Mystery Men, Magnolia, Jurassic Park III, Focus, Panic, Welcome to Collinwood, Seabiscuit, The Cooler and Sahara.

His work on ER and Sports Night has also been recognized with Emmy nominations.

In a November 2003 interview with USA Today, Macy stated that he wanted to star in a big-budget action film "for the money, for the security of a franchise like that. And I love big action-adventure movies. They're way cool." He serves as director-in-residence at the Atlantic Theater Company in New York, where he teaches a technique called Practical Aesthetics. A book describing the technique, A Practical Handbook for the Actor, is dedicated to Macy and Mamet.

In 2007, Macy starred in Wild Hogs, a film about middle-aged men reliving their youthful days by taking to the open road on their Harley-Davidson motorcycles from Cincinnati to the Pacific Coast. Despite being critically panned, with a 14% "rotten" rating from Rotten Tomatoes, it was a financial success, grossing over $168 million. The film also reunited him with his A Civil Action costar, John Travolta. In 2009, Macy completed filming on The Maiden Heist, a comedy that co-starred Morgan Freeman and Christopher Walken.

On June 23, 2008, the Hollywood Chamber of Commerce announced Macy and his wife, Felicity Huffman, would each receive a star on the Hollywood Walk of Fame in the upcoming year. On January 13, 2009, Macy replaced Jeremy Piven in David Mamet's Speed-the-Plow on Broadway. Piven suddenly and unexpectedly dropped out of the play in December 2008 after he experienced health problems; Norbert Leo Butz covered the role from December 23, 2008, until Macy took over the part. Dirty Girl, which starred Macy along with Juno Temple, Milla Jovovich, Mary Steenburgen and Tim McGraw, premiered September 12, 2010, at the Toronto International Film Festival.

In summer 2010, Macy joined the Showtime pilot Shameless as the protagonist, Frank Gallagher. The project ultimately went to series, and its first season premiered on January 9, 2011. Macy has received high critical acclaim for his performance, eventually getting an Emmy nomination for Outstanding Lead Actor in a Comedy Series in 2014.

In the 2012 film The Sessions, Macy played a priest who helps a man with a severe disability find personal fulfillment through a sex surrogate. He made his directorial debut with the independent drama Rudderless, which stars Billy Crudup, Anton Yelchin, Felicity Huffman, Selena Gomez and Laurence Fishburne. In 2017, he directed The Layover, a road trip comedy starring Alexandra Daddario and Kate Upton.

In 2015, he had a small role as Grandpa in the drama film Room, which was nominated for the Academy Award for Best Picture. The film reunited him with his Pleasantville costar, Joan Allen.

Personal life

Macy and actress Felicity Huffman dated on-and-off for 15 years and married on September 6, 1997. They have two daughters, Sophia Grace (born December 1, 2000) and Georgia Grace (born March 14, 2002).

Macy and Huffman appeared at a rally for John Kerry in 2004. Macy plays the ukulele and is an avid woodturner. He has appeared on the cover of Fine Woodworkings special edition, Wood Turning Basics and was featured in an article in the April 2015 issue of American Woodturner (American Association of Woodturners). He is a national ambassador for the United Cerebral Palsy Association.

Since shooting the film Wild Hogs, Macy has had a strong interest in riding motorcycles.

Varsity Blues scandal

In March 2019, it was reported that Macy and Huffman had agreed to pay someone $15,000 to take a college entrance exam for their daughter Sophia. Huffman was indicted on fraud and conspiracy charges as part of a wider federal investigation of college admissions bribery. For undisclosed reasons, no charges were filed against Macy. 

On September 13, 2019, a federal judge in Boston sentenced Huffman to 14 days in federal prison, serving 10 days. As of October 2020, Huffman completed the other parts of her sentence, which included 250 hours of community service and a year of supervised release.

Filmography

Film

Television

Awards and nominations

References

External links

 
 
 
 

1950 births
Living people
People from Florida
20th-century American male actors
21st-century American male actors
American acting theorists
American male film actors
American male television actors
American male voice actors
American ukulele players
Bethany College (West Virginia) alumni
California Democrats
Florida Democrats
Georgia (U.S. state) Democrats
Goddard College alumni
Independent Spirit Award for Best Male Lead winners
American acting coaches
Male actors from Miami
Male actors from Vermont
Maryland Democrats
Outstanding Performance by a Lead Actor in a Miniseries or Movie Primetime Emmy Award winners
Outstanding Performance by a Male Actor in a Comedy Series Screen Actors Guild Award winners
Outstanding Performance by a Male Actor in a Miniseries or Television Movie Screen Actors Guild Award winners
Actors from Cumberland, Maryland
Vermont Democrats
Woodturners